The Presidential Fitness Test was a national physical fitness testing program conducted in United States public middle- and high- schools from the late 1950s until 2013, when it was disbanded and replaced with the Presidential Youth Fitness Program.

Origins of the test (1940s1950s) 

National interest in physical fitness testing existed in the United States since the late 1800s. Early testing generally focused on anthropometric measurement (such as lung capacity or strength assessment) and was facilitated by organizations that emerged at the time, such as the American Association for the Advancement of Physical Education (AAAPE), and the American Alliance for Health, Physical Education, Recreation (AAHPER). By the early 1900s, physical fitness testing had transitioned to focus more on the concept of "physical efficiency," a term used to describe the healthy function of bodily systems. During the early 1900s, the purpose of the fitness tests shifted more toward determining "motor ability," and consisted of climbing, running, and jumping exercises. During and after World War I, fitness testing and physical training for children increased in schools and garnered attention from governmental agencies, as they were linked to preparedness for combat. A similar process occurred during and after World War II, when military, public health, and education services held conferences and published manuals on the topic of youth fitness. In the 1950s, the American government agencies were re-assessing education in general, especially in regards to increasing the United States' ability to compete with the Soviet Union. For example, as a direct reaction to the Soviet Union's successful launch of the first Earth orbiting satellite, Sputnik, in 1957, congress passed the National Defense Education Act of 1958. The act allocated funding to American universities, specifically aimed at improving programs in science, mathematics, and foreign language. Physical education and fitness were also among the topics of reassessment during the 1950s. The AAPHER appointed a committee on physical education, which recommended that public schools shift their programs away from obstacle courses and boxing, the likes of which were popular during World War II, and toward a more balanced approach to recreation, including games, sports, and outdoor activities.

The Kraus-Weber test 
The impetus for the style of physical testing that developed into the Presidential Fitness Test was a research study conducted by Dr. Hans Kraus and Dr. Sonya Weber in the early 1950s. The study, originally connected to their research in lower back pain, resulted in a diagnostic test for muscular fitness called the "Minimum Muscular Fitness Test," which would later come to be known as the "Kraus-Weber Fitness Test." As its original name implies, Drs. Kraus and Weber considered the test to determine minimum fitness levels; it consisted only of 6 basic exercises. 

One of their experiments involved conducting the fitness test on 4,000 children on the East Coast, which showed that 56.6% of children between 6 and 16 failed the test. The high rate of failure alarmed the doctors, and spurred them to question whether the findings were dependent on location. Dr. Kraus enlarged the experiment, testing 3,000 rural, urban, and suburban children in Italy, Switzerland, and Austria with the help of fitness activist Bonnie Prudden. On average, they found that only 8.2 European children failed the test. From their results, Drs. Kraus and Weber concluded that, despite American children's high standard of living, they lacked "sufficient exercise to keep them at the minimum level of muscular fitness." The study had a sensational effect on American media, provoking alarm in parents, school administrators, and government officials. In 1955, government officials including John Kelly, the National Director of physical fitness during WWII, approached President Eisenhower with the findings of the study. Apparently moved by the seemingly alarming results, Eisenhower called a meeting of various sports and fitness authorities, and appointed Vice President Richard Nixon as the chair of a new presidential committee dedicated to developing a national fitness program.

Public perception of the tests was guided by a sense of fear and alarm that American children were lagging behind their European counterparts. Dr. Kraus himself interpreted the results of the study as reflective of American decadence, citing how walking less and doing fewer demanding household chores differentiated American children from European children. A Sports Illustrated article from 1955 elaborates on conclusions that were publicly drawn from the comparative Kraus-Weber study. The article, in keeping with the general consensus of the time, identifies the cause of American children's' low test scores as "America's plush standard of living" which derived from "a number of factors ranging from the playpen to the school bus to television." The author places the blame for American children's poor performance on parents, arguing that the 54% of 6-year-olds who failed the Kraus-Weber Tests were not physically prepared enough to begin school. The author also points to public schools and their lackluster physical education programs as deserving blame.

Contemporary scholars, however, have since contradicted the popular conclusions from the Kraus-Weber comparative study. The results of the Kraus-Weber tests importantly showed no stratification between wealthy and poor children, thus casting doubt on the idea that decadent lifestyles were the cause of high failure rate. Practice was the key to succeeding at the tests, which Kraus and Weber noted themselves in their research. Physical education in European schools was more similar to the calisthenic-type exercises given on the test, therefore European children had more experience with the test's movements, and performed better. The test also did not measure fitness in a holistic sense, and thus was not necessarily an indicator of general physical fitness in the way American officials and media supposed.

Eisenhower presidency 
In July 1956, President Eisenhower created the President's Council on Youth Fitness by Executive Order. Shortly after, AAHPER established the Youth Fitness Project, which was tasked with conducting an initial study on the fitness of children nationwide. The council adopted and expanded on the testing items from a California testing program, deciding that the basic test would consist of 6 parts: 1) Pull-ups (for boys), modified pull-ups (for girls), 2) sit-ups, 3) shuttle run, 4) standing broad jump, 5) 50-yard dash, and 6) softball throw for distance. The Council later added a 7th item, a 600-yard walk-run, and after consulting the American Red Cross, listed multiple aquatic tests, which were not widely implemented due to lack of access to swimming facilities at most American schools. In 1958, AAHPER published these items as the first official youth fitness test.

Implementation of the test (Kennedy to Bush) 
The transition into John F. Kennedy's presidency marked a new era for the Fitness Test. Before he took office, Kennedy advocated for youth physical fitness in his article "The Soft American," published in Sports Illustrated. In the widely popular article, the president fed into Cold War paranoia about American subservience, articulating concerns about children spending too much time watching television and not enough time building strong bodies. "The harsh fact of the matter is that there is also an increasingly large number of young Americans who are neglecting their bodies – whose physical fitness is not what it should be – who are getting soft. And such softness on the part of the individual citizen can help to strip and destroy the vitality of a nation." Linking the supposed state of American youth to the security and futurity of the nation, Kennedy set the stage for the aims of his presidency's Fitness Test.

Kennedy changed the name to the President's Council on Physical Fitness with the aim of addressing all age groups. In partnership with the Advertising Council, President Kennedy participated in a nationwide public service advertising campaign that promoted taking the 50-mile hikes previously required of U.S. Marine officers. Kennedy contributed to reinforcing the connection between Cold War anxieties and individual child physical vigilance.

In 1966, Kennedy's successor Lyndon B. Johnson's President's Council established the Presidential Physical Fitness Award Program, acknowledging youth who met or exceeded the 85th percentile on all seven test items. This program would later contribute much of the fodder of complaints about the test, inspiring competition and reinitiating relative benchmarks into physical education classes across the nation.

The Physical Fitness Test underwent edits throughout the 70s and 80s. In 1976, the softball throw was deleted, the sit-up was modified, and the distance runs were included as options. While the softball throw was originally theorized as being helpful to mimic the potential throwing arm when faced with the need to throw a grenade, the throw was removed as it was considered to be a skill rather than a fitness-related item. The sit-up was modified on the idea that the bent-knee approach was less stressful on the back than a straight-leg approach. The goals of running for longer distances rather than mimicking the running drills of the navy also inspired lengthier running options.

The Presidential Fitness Test would continue to remain widely implemented, and the Award program expanded to include sports through the Carter and Reagan administrations. The focus remained on exceptional performance of individual children, celebrating those who performed at the top of their classes.

Conclusion of the test (Clinton to Obama) 

Bill Clinton's presidency marked a turn for the Presidential Council on Sports, Fitness, and Nutrition, first promoting materials that engaged all children, not just those that rose to the top of their specific fitness tests. In partnership with the Sporting Good Manufacturers Association (SGMA) and International Health, Racquet, and Sportsclub Association (IHRSA), and the Advertising Council, Clinton's Council developed 3-year ad campaigns focused on youth fitness titled "Get Off It!" and "Get Up, Get Out!".

George W. Bush's Council continued this trend of engaging even the lowest performing children. In 2003, Chairman Lynn Swann spoke to the National Press Club about the council's programs and emphasized the Presidential Active Lifestyle Award with goals of helping Americans and American children in particular to "Be Physically Active Every Day". These awards focused on the continuous practice of fitness rather than the singular exceptional performance. While the Presidential Fitness Test and Award System remained present in school systems, the expansion of evaluating health and wellness practices contributed to the trend away from the Test. 

Ultimately, the Obama presidency brought on the retirement of the Presidential Fitness Test. First Lady Michelle Obama dedicated much of her writing to children's fitness and nutrition. Launching "Let's Move!" in 2010, the First Lady stated her goal of "solving the challenge of childhood obesity within a generation so that children born today will reach adulthood at a healthy weight." The program included a flash workout featuring Beyoncé, an emphasis on nutrition, and a focus on providing support to communities and schools with the least number of resources. This individualized approach to bolstering individual health continued to replace the Cold War hope of individual exceptionalism.

On September 10, 2012, the President's Council launched the Presidential Youth Fitness Program, presented as a comprehensive school-based program that combined science and technology to promote the health and physical fitness of all America's youth. The Program was created through a private-public partnership between the President's Council on Sports, Fitness, and Nutrition, the Centers for Disease Control and Prevention, the National Fitness Foundation, the Society of Health and Physical Educators, and The Cooper Institute. This signaled the retirement of the Presidential Fitness Test. The Presidential Youth Fitness Program utilizes a new form of calculations, placing students within ranges and removing the Award for achieving the highest category. Instead, students are provided with individual assessments and goals, with the structure of how to achieve the goal. In place of the Presidential Fitness Test, the Program emphasizes individual progress over exceptionalism.

Impact on children

Physical health impacts 
While the stated goal of the Presidential Fitness Test was focused on bettering the health of America's youth, present day critiques of the test have brought to light the misalignment between the promises and the impact. Specifically, the Presidential Youth Fitness Program has focused their energy on shifting ideas away from the measurements of athletic performance and turning toward health-related fitness. The Fitness Test was designed to capture best performance at core strength, aerobic capacity, upper-body strength, speed and agility, and flexibility. However, the program did not provide Physical Education teachers with the structure to improve the performance of the children in their classes. The shift toward the Fitness Program is an attempt to capture the health-related fitness level of children, providing educators with the ability to improve specific areas of health. By today's standards, the Fitness Test failed to improve the individual and population level youth health of America. Instead, it worked as a tool of comparison and shame, positioning children against other children without providing a curriculum to improve.

Mental health impacts 
In recent years, childhood obesity has been on a global wide rise. Parents and doctors are very concerned by the potential effects of obesity on the future health and life quality of children. The Presidential Fitness Test and ultimately gym class have been seen as the solution for this rise in obesity because it promotes more physical activity within school, and the hope is that it would promote that same trend outside of school. However, many of those children who have gone through these gym classes, and specifically The Presidential Fitness Test have provided a different perspective on the role and effectiveness of these efforts. A student who was interviewed for a study on fatphobia in physical education and attended school in the 70s and 80s stated that "I think [physical education] was just to let kids have healthier bodies… but I think even back then there was this fatphobic attitude. I think a large part of it was trying to eradicate the fatness of kids." The other students that were interviewed for this study came to the consensus that they "recalled feelings of alienation, dread, and disembodiment." They also recalled that during gym class, oftentimes they felt "humiliated, vulnerable, or incompetent." 

Studies have been done on programs such as Texas Fitness Now that have revealed that physical education as it exists in the United States has caused a rise in disciplinary issues in children and absences from school. This study comes to the conclusion that physical programs allow for the harassment of children who do not measure up to the physical fitness standards, and that is why so many students skip their P.E classes.

Rise in body image issues 
Reports from recent years have shown that children as young as 7 years old identify "fat students" at their schools as being lazier than other students, having fewer friends, and having worse relationships with their parents. Several studies have shown that the dissatisfaction that young girls have with their bodies only increases as they grow older, and these concerns begin as young as 8 years old. One study reports that "the number of girls who wanted to be thinner increased from 40% in grade 3 to 79% in grade 6." This same study reports that both young girls and young boys who are overweight express the desire to be thinner at much higher rates than their thin classmates. This increase in body insecurity has been reported in multiple studies and researchers are worried that this trend will raise the risk of children developing eating disorders and depression.

Effects on definitions of childhood 
The Presidential Fitness Test began with the narrative that American had gone soft and needed to "toughen up" in order to prepare for a potential war. Since then, this narrative has taken on new forms under different presidents. After 9/11, childhood obesity entered the public forum as a question of the "terror within" America, and the seeds of destruction of the society. Many researchers believe that the driving force underneath the physical education programs of the United States have consisted of the drive to create the "perfect soldier." Studies have been done on how this narrative has created a childhood that is focused only on creating the perfect soldier for times of threat. There is a consensus among researchers from these studies that this level of fear in citizens has created a culture of health tracking that relies on "greater surveillance and restriction of individual bodies."  Teachers have argued that this approach to physical education has created unhealthy relationships with exercise and activity. Physical educators that were involved in the Texas Fitness claimed that the program failed because it did not take a holistic approach to children's health. It focused too much on attaining skills instead of exercising for the sake of exercise and these teachers emphasized that "research shows that people can get a good workout even when walking, and the more important thing is to create a healthy relationship with exercise that can last for decades."

Physical education today

Within the classroom 
The Presidential Fitness Test to Presidential Youth Fitness Program shift has impacted the inside of the Physical Education classroom. Throughout the 1960s and 1970s, best practices of P.E. classes were those focused on a sports model. This allowed for students who had strong fitness and movement skills coming into the class to shine, while those who did not already have those skills to dislike class or attempt not to participate. In combination, the sports curriculum and the fitness testing created a culture of comparison and a single universal approach to teaching. In the 2000s, the combination of government and scientific programs brought about a new focus for teaching a wellness focused curriculum. In place of the focus on best performing children, the new curriculums allow for students to receive individualized attention and develop skills of teamwork and basic health knowledge through play.

Beyond the classroom 
Beyond the classroom, the focus on youth health and fitness in America remains in the present. Corporations have begun to fund programs like Michelle Obama's "Let's Move!", increasing the popularity of advertisements around childhood fitness. The National Football League's "Play 60" campaign is one prominent example. In partnership with the American Heart Association, GoNoodle, and the Cooper Institute, the program has developed a playbook for engaging in fitness related activities at home. Since it was launched in 2007, the League has donated more than $352K toward programming, grants, and awareness campaigns. Similarly, corporations like Disney and McDonalds have developed their own programming focused on advertising the importance of fitness for children. No longer about the singular child's excellence, the shift in focus toward getting all children to be active has created an opportunity for corporations to fund programming to a broad audience.

References

Fitness tests
Health policy in the United States
Education in the United States
Physical education